Claudette Maillé (born 11 November 1964) is a Mexican actress best known for her roles in Mexican telenovelas and films. She has won two Ariel awards, one in 1992 as Best Supporting Actress for her participation in the film Like Water for Chocolate, and other in 1994 as Best Actress in the film Novia que te vea.

Early years 
Maillé born in Mexico City, Mexico on 11 November 1964. Of French descent, Claudette was born in Mexico, but spent several years of her adolescence in France, next to her mother and her siblings. In France, she began to study dance and acting. At age 20, Maillé returned to Mexico, where she continued to study acting at National Autonomous University of Mexico, but as a result of the strike suffered by the university, she switched to the Núcleo de Estudios Teatrales.

Filmography

Film roles

Television roles

References

External links 
 

1964 births
Living people
Mexican emigrants to France
21st-century Mexican actresses
20th-century Mexican actresses
Mexican stage actresses
Mexican telenovela actresses
Mexican television actresses